Lorence R. Wenke (born October 9, 1945) is an American politician from the state of Michigan. He is a former member of the Michigan House of Representatives.

Career
Wenke served in the Michigan House of Representatives. In 2004, Wenke was one of only two Republicans in the state legislature to vote against adding an amendment to the Michigan Constitution outlawing gay marriage. Tonya Schuitmaker defeated Wenke in the 2010 Republican Party primary election for the 20th district of the Michigan Senate.

With Schuitmaker running for reelection in a different district in the 2014 election, Wenke announced that he would run for the 20th district seat in September 2013. In 2014, he switched to the Libertarian Party over difference with the Republican Party on gay marriage and issues surrounding taxation. Running in the general election against Democratic Party nominee Sean McCann and Republican Party nominee Margaret O'Brien, Wenke received less than 10% of the vote. His 7,000 votes were the most for a Libertarian candidate in Kalamazoo County history.

See also
 Party switching in the United States

References

External links

Living people
People from Richland, Michigan
Republican Party members of the Michigan House of Representatives
American libertarians
Michigan Libertarians
1945 births
Politicians from Kalamazoo, Michigan
21st-century American politicians